Scott Krycia (born March 24, 1971) is an American film director, film producer, actor, and photographer.

Biography 
Krycia was raised in Bethlehem, Pennsylvania and after finishing high school he graduated from Northampton Community College in Bethlehem, Pennsylvania.  Krycia formed K Studios in 1997 with his college classmate, Sean Tiedeman.  In May 2005, The Eastern Pennsylvania Business Journal named Krycia in the top 20 of the region's business leaders under the age of 40.

Photography 
Scott Krycia, a curious photographer with a sense of wanderlust found his passion at just 10 years old. Following his father into a store, he was fascinated by the magic of photography. How a camera can capture a moment in time and tell and tell a lifetime of stories all at one time. Based in the Lehigh Valley region of Pennsylvania, Scott graduated college in 1995 and quickly garnered an exceptional reputation working with companies like Majestic, NorthFace, Martin Guitar, DeWalt, shooting still photography on film and TV sets, concert tours and more all while honing his craft by traveling the world. Krycia's work has been featured on CNN, NatGeo Traveler and Discovery Networks.

Filmography

Director 
 Hell's Half Acre (2006) – Blackplague Films
 The Stage (2003–Current) – A Telly Award winning regional television program airing on Service Electric Cable TV and Blue Ridge Communications.

Producer 

 Killer: Malevolence 3 (2018) – Co-Producer/Mena Films
 Eavesdrop (2008) – Associate Producer/Shoreline Entertainment
 Gingerdead Man 2: Passion of the Crust (2008) – 'Honorary' Executive Producer/Full Moon Features
 Hell's Half Acre (2006) – Producer/blackplague films
 Evil Bong (2006) – Associate Producer/Full Moon Features
 Everything's Jake (2000) – Associate Producer/Warner Bros.

Actor 
 Brutal Massacre: A Comedy (2008) – Photographer/Anchor Bay Entertainment

Camera and Electrical Department 
All in Time (2015) – Still Photographer
Alana (2010) – Still Photographer
Sketched Out (2009) – Still Photographer
Forged (2009) – Still Photographer
N.A.M (2009) – Still Photographer
 Eavesdrop (2008) – Still Photographer/Shoreline Entertainment
 Malevolence: Bereavement (2009) – Still Photographer
 Brutal Massacre: A Comedy (2008) – Still Photographer/Anchor Bay Entertainment
100 Scariest Movie Moments (2004) – Camera Operator: interview segments/Bravo (US TV channel)

Production Services 
 The Making of Brutal Massacre: A Comedy (2008) – Camera and Post-Production/Anchor Bay Entertainment
 Eavesdrop: A Conversation with Writer/Director Matthew Miele (2008) – Production Services

Special Thanks 
Grace: Delivered (2009) – Anchor Bay Entertainment
Monsterpiece Theatre Volume 1 (2009)
 Brutal Massacre: A Comedy (2008)
Evil Bong – Full Moon Features (2006)

Feature Film Directing career

Hell's Half Acre (2006) 
A serial killer is brought to justice by his victims and burned alive on what is now known as Hell's Half Acre. Years later, a faceless killer begins slaughtering the townspeople. Losing her friends and family, Nicole Becker (Tesia Nicoli) decides to go after the killer with all she's got. Double machetes, shotguns, dual handguns, and even a chain gun are all part of this killer's arsenal. Needless to say, it's gonna be messy.

External links 

K Studios Official Site
Scott Krycia Photography
Eastern Pennsylvania Business Journal Profile
2005 Media Hounds NCC magazine article
Hell's Half Acre Official Web Page
Hell's Half Acre Official Myspace Page
THE ALLENTOWN TIMES Cover Story on Hell's Half Acre
Hell's Half Acre review from SYNERGY MAGAZINE
Eavesdrop Official Web Page
Everything's Jake Official Movie Site
Brutal Massacre: A Comedy Official Web Page
POCONO RECORD Hell's Half Acre/Sherman Theater article

References

1971 births
Living people
People from Bethlehem, Pennsylvania
Film directors from Pennsylvania